The Santa Cruz Railroad was a narrow gauge railroad that ran  from Santa Cruz to Pajaro, California.  It started operation in 1874, running from the east bank of the San Lorenzo River to Soquel, California.  With completion of a bridge over the San Lorenzo, it began operation over its full length in 1876 and was sold in foreclosure in 1881.

History
After Southern Pacific completed a railroad to Monterey, California in November 1871, with a stop at Pajaro near Watsonville, California, Santa Cruz County, California voted to subsidize construction of a railroad from Watsonville to Santa Cruz. When Southern Pacific seemed uninterested in building a standard-gauge railway, the narrow gauge Santa Cruz Railroad was built with local financing, led by Frederick A. Hihn and Claus Spreckels. Construction began at Santa Cruz in 1873. Trestling was more extensive than had been predicted, and expensive Howe truss bridges were required to cross the Soquel and San Lorenzo Rivers. The first train from Watsonville reached Santa Cruz on 7 May 1876. Operational income was insufficient to cover unexpected expenses from a right-of-way disagreement near Watsonville and repair of storm damage in the winter of 1877-78. The Santa Cruz Railroad was unable to pay bond interest after completion of the South Pacific Coast Railroad in 1880 gave residents of Santa Cruz a shorter route to San Francisco. Operations ceased in February 1881. Through a subsidiary Pacific Improvement Company, Southern Pacific purchased the railroad in foreclosure for less than the construction cost, and converted it to standard gauge in 1883. Southern Pacific formed the subsidiary Pajaro and Santa Cruz Railroad on 11 April 1884 to operate the line until actual merger into Southern Pacific on 14 May 1888. The  Aptos branch from Aptos to Loma Prieta was built as the Loma Prieta Railroad in 1883 and abandoned in 1928.

Locomotives

See also

 Roaring Camp & Big Trees Narrow Gauge Railroad
 Santa Cruz, Big Trees and Pacific Railway

References

External links
 Santa Cruz Trains - Google Map of Santa Cruz historic train routes
 Santa Cruz Trains Book

Railway companies established in 1874
Railway companies disestablished in 1881
Narrow gauge railroads in California
3 ft gauge railways in the United States